Chesistege is a genus of moths in the family Geometridae. It contains only one species, Chesistege korbi, which is found in Turkey, Armenia and Turkmenistan.

Subspecies
Chesistege korbi korbi
Chesistege korbi kopetdagica Viidalepp, 1992
Chesistege korbi taurica (Wehrli, 1938)

References
 Chesistege at Markku Savela's Lepidoptera and Some Other Life Forms
 Natural History Museum Lepidoptera genus database

Chesiadini
Monotypic moth genera
Endemic fauna of Turkey
Moths described in 1909
Moths of Asia